Mridula Vijai is an Indian actress who predominantly works in the Malayalam television industry along with a few Tamil films.

Early life
She was born as Sreelakshmi, to Vijaikumar and Rani Vijaikumar, and later changed her name to Mridula. She is settled in Trivandrum, Kerala. She has a younger sister, Parvathy who is also a television actress.

Personal life
Mridula got engaged to television actor Yuva Krishna on 23 December 2020. The couple got married on 8 July 2021 at Attukal Temple, Thiruvananthapuram. They have a daughter, Dhwani Krishna, born in 2022.

Career
She played a minor role in Nooram Naal directed by Raja Desingu. Later made her debut with Tamil movie Jennifer Karuppayya playing the female lead Rosy. She is associated with two projects 'Infinity’ and Next Token Number’ which didn't materialize. She also acted in a Malayalam film Celebration which was a box office disaster.

In 2015, she made her television debut with Kalyanasougandhikam in Asianet and later Krishnathulasi in Mazhavil Manorama gave her a break and rose her popularity among Malayali audience. She also played a character role in hit series Manjurukum Kalam. Mridula replaced Sonu Satheesh Kumar in Bharya playing the role of Rohini. She has also participated in reality shows like Dancing Stars, Comedy Stars, Ammayimaar Varum Ellaam Sheriyaakum, Star War, Surya Jodi No.1,Tamar Patar, Let's Rock & Roll  and Star Magic. She also participated in the reality show Suryajodi No.1 alongside Vishwa in 2020.

Filmography

Television

Serials

Reality shows

Special appearances

Music videos
 2019 - "Kadhakal Neele"
 2020 - "Keralam Gathi Mattum"

You Tube
 2020-Present : Mridva Vlogs

References

External links

Indian television actresses
Indian film actresses
Actresses in Malayalam television
Actresses in Malayalam cinema
Actresses in Tamil cinema
Year of birth missing (living people)
Living people